Scared Stiff (also known as Treasure of Fear (American television title) and You'll Be The Death Of Me Yet) is a 1945 American comedic murder mystery directed by Frank McDonald for Pine-Thomas Productions and released by Paramount Pictures. The film stars Jack Haley, Ann Savage and Barton MacLane.

Plot
At his uncle's newspaper where Larry Elliot (Jack Haley) works as a reporter specializing in chess, he is known to miss out on bigger stories to cover more trivial events of minor interest. Confronted with an ultimatum if he wants to keep his job, Larry is assigned to cover a big harvest festival held at a winery in Grape City.

Larry begins with getting off the bus at the wrong stop, Grape Center instead of Grape City. He has brought along his girlfriend Sally Warren (Ann Savage), who deals in antiques. Accidents rarely come alone, and the man sitting next to Larry on the bus is found murdered, holding a chess piece in his hand when the police find him. Of course Larry, who is a chess expert, is blamed for the killing.

All the bus passengers are held in custody at Grape Center awaiting the sheriff to start the murder investigation. Before he arrives, Sally finds a set of antique chess pieces she wants to acquire, and involves Larry in her quest to buy them. The set is said to have been the property of Kublai Khan in the 13th century, and brought to the West by Marco Polo. Unfortunately, the set is divided between Charles and Preston Waldeck (Lucien Littlefield), twins owning the winery, who have not spoken to each other in 10 years.

Sally manages to acquire the white set pieces from Preston. When Larry is about to get the black pieces from Charles, both he and Charles are knocked out by an unknown attacker, who also steals the black set pieces.

The sheriff arrives, and starts conducting his investigation. The prime suspect is convicted murderer Deacon Markham (Barton MacLane), who first sold the antique chess set to the Waldeck brothers, after stealing it from its rightful owner. The theory is that Markham now wants the set back to sell it back to the first owner and get the money he needs to escape the country.

Markham reveals himself when holding Larry at gunpoint in his hotel room to get the white pieces from the set. Markham and his accomplice Mink (George E. Stone) hide when Sally enters the room, telling Larry she hid the pieces in his room. Soon after, another guest, Flo Rosson (Veda Ann Borg), also enters the room and reveals that she is an insurance agent tracking Markham's gang to retrieve the chess set. She also reveals that the man killed on the bus was part of this gang of thieves.

Also at the inn is Preston's grandson, Oliver Waldeck (Buddy Swan), a precocious boy genius, and his mentor, Professor Wisner (Robert Emmett Keane). Oliver frightens Larry with scary antics, including a pronouncement that the corpse's head was chopped off, placing a cabbage adorned by a toupee in Larry's room. Oliver throws a smoke bomb into the room, and everyone is forced out into the corridor. In the ensuing commotion, the white pieces are stolen.

Snooping about the winery, Larry manages to find the black set, but is knocked unconscious in the wine cellar. When she finds the other part of the set, Sally is also knocked out by Oliver's tutor, Professor Wisner. Larry wakes up, unties himself and goes after the killer, who turns out to be Professor Wisner, and ultimately finds the dead body.

After Sally has found the complete set, the insurance adjuster Flo offers her a $1,000 reward for retrieving it. Larry phones his editor, explaining the events at Grape Center and how he caught the murderer. He then asks his editor if he should continue to the festival at Grape City or come back and get fired.

Cast

 Jack Haley as Larry Elliot
 Ann Savage as Sally Warren
 Barton MacLane as George "Deacon" Markham
 Veda Ann Borg as Flo Rosson
 Roger Pryor as Richardson
 George E. Stone as Mink
 Robert Emmett Keane as Prof. Wisner
 Lucien Littlefield as Charles Waldeck / Preston Waldeck
 Paul Hurst as Sheriff
 Arthur Aylesworth as Emerson Cooke
 Eily Malyon as Mrs. Cooke
 Buddy Swan as Oliver Waldeck

Production 
Principal photography under the working title of You'll Be the Death of Me Yet on the production began in early November 1944.

Jack Haley had been signed to a multi-picture contract with Pine-Thomas in 1944. Pine-Thomas were so pleased with Ann Savage that they signed her to a three-film contract.

Reception
As with other Pine-Thomas Productions, Scared Stiff was released as a B-movie with low production values. Ann Savage's biographers Lisa Morton and Kent Adamson relegated Scared Stiff to merely "lackluster" and "forgettable".

The production team of William H. Pine  and William C. Thomas, known in the industry as the "Two Dollar Bills", reissued the film as Treasure of Fear, as part of a package of 30 of their films for television in 1955. By that time Paramount had used the title Scared Stiff for the Martin and Lewis 1953 film of the same title.

Due to copyright problems, Scared Stiff fell into public domain; recently it was released in Mill Creek's Fabulous Forties box set.

References

Notes

Bibliography

 Morton, Lisa and Kent Adamson. Savage Detours: The Life and Work of Ann Savage.  Jefferson, North Carolina: McFarland & Company, 2009. .

External links 
 
 .

1945 films
1940s comedy mystery films
1940s crime comedy films
American crime comedy films
1940s English-language films
American black-and-white films
Films directed by Frank McDonald
American comedy mystery films
1945 comedy films
Paramount Pictures films
1940s American films